Bararud (also Romanized as Barārūd; also known as Bararu) is a village in Dolfak Rural District, Khorgam District, Rudbar County, Gilan Province, Iran. At the 2006 census, its population was 182, in 64 families.

References 

Populated places in Rudbar County